The Olympic Project for Human Rights (OPHR) was an American organization established by sociologist Harry Edwards and others, including noted Olympians  Tommie Smith and John Carlos, in October 1967. The aim of the organization was to protest against racial segregation in the United States and elsewhere (such as South Africa), and racism in sports in general.

Smith said that the project was about human rights, of "all humanity, even those who denied us ours." Most members of the OPHR were African American athletes or community leaders.

Background 
In the middle of the 20th century sports in the United States of America were used to imply that there was less institutional racism than there was. In an interview with Vox, Dexter Blackman, a professor of history at Morgan State University, states: "The media began to promote the black athlete as a symbol that racial democracy existed in the United States ... a factor that was used to dismiss the question of institutionalized racism". This was prevalent even prior to the formal abolition of legal segregation in the United States.

Proposed boycott of the 1968 Summer Olympics 
The group advocated a boycott of the 1968 Summer Olympic Games in Mexico City unless four conditions were met:
South Africa and Rhodesia uninvited from the Olympics (both countries were under white minority rule at the time).
The restoration of Muhammad Ali's world heavyweight boxing title.
Avery Brundage to step down as President of the International Olympic Committee. 
Hiring of more African-American assistant coaches.

Black Power salute 

While the boycott largely failed to materialize, African-American sprinters Tommie Smith and John Carlos and Australian sprinter Peter Norman wore OPHR patches during the medal ceremony for the 200-meter race. Tommie Smith and John Carlos also raised their hands in a "Black Power salute" during the playing of the United States national anthem.

Despite being a primarily African-American organization, the OPHR was supported by white athletes such as Norman and members of the Harvard University rowing team.

References 

Human rights organizations based in the United States
Sports organizations established in 1967